Pinthaeus is a genus of stink bugs (family Pentatomidae).

Species
 Pinthaeus sanguinipes (Fabricius, 1781)

References

External links
 Biolib
 Fauna Europaea

Asopinae
Pentatomidae genera